Birmingham Market Hall was a municipal market hall in the Bull Ring area of Birmingham, England (and part of the city centre there), from 1835 to 1940, when the interior and roof were destroyed by enemy bombing; although parts remained in use until final demolition in the 1960s.

Background 

Urban population increases in 18th & 19th century England and Wales arising out of industrialisation, gave impetus to changes in the ownership and provision of physical market places for the sale of foodstuffs and other products in towns and cities. More than 300 Acts of Parliament were passed between 1801 and 1880 allowing nascent local governments to acquire market rights from their manorial holders, and to fund the construction of market facilities. From about 1800, market halls emerged as the 'perfect form' of the market place, and town followed town in bringing their markets indoors into roofed buildings supplying amenities such as water and heating. In particular, St. John's Market, a capacious market hall constructed in Liverpool from 1820 to 1822, came to be taken as a model for other locations, including Birmingham.

In the late 18th century, Birmingham's street commissioners were authorised to buy and demolish houses in the town centre, including houses surrounding the Bull Ring, and to centre all market activity in the area. A wide area fronting St Martin's Church formed the marketplace. The Street Commissioners decided that a sheltered market hall was needed, with powers granted by the Improvement Act of 1828 (9 Geo. IV). They bought the market rights from the lord of the manor and, by 1832, all properties on site had been purchased, with exception of two, whose owners demanded a higher price. To fund the purchase of these properties, two buildings were constructed either side of the market hall and the leases sold at auction.

Railways arrived in Birmingham in 1837, shortly after the hall opened, facilitating the supply of fresh produce from further afield. Subsequently, New Street (1854) and Moor Street (1909) railway stations were built, opposite the west and east ends of the market hall, respectively.

Design 

Construction of the Market Hall, designed by Charles Edge (the architect who completed Birmingham Town Hall) in the Classical style, began with the laying of a foundation stone on 28 February 1833. It was completed by Dewsbury and Walthews at a cost of £20,000 (£44,800 if the price of acquiring the land is included) and opened on 12 February 1835, containing 600 market stalls. The building was grand and the façade consisted of Bath stone. Two large Doric columns supported a wide entrance at each end of the building. At the end of the market day, metal gates were pulled in front of the entrances.

The hall fronted onto High Street (no longer extant south of its junction with New Street) to its east, with another entrance up steep steps, on Worcester Street to the east. Phillips Street (now a tunnel linking Smallbrook Street to Moor Street) was to its north, and Bell Street (now lost) to its south. The site sloped steeply down, to the south.

Operation 

Smoking was prohibited inside the Hall, and dogs were not allowed. Traders were not allowed to wash or clean vegetables after 9am.

The hall is noted as a pioneer in the supply and promotion of fish as part of its urban population's diet, and by the 1880s is seen as responsible for fish entering the daily diet of the vast majority of the West Midlands population. A separate wholesale Fish Market building, across Bell Street from the market hall, opened in 1869 and was extended in 1883.

Birmingham was granted a Charter of Incorporation in 1838, and the first Birmingham Town Council was elected later that year, taking on responsibility for the town's markets from 1851. It became a city in 1889.

A January 1849 meeting of the Market Committee of the Street Commissioners resolved to make improvements to the hall, including seven new fish, game and poultry shops, and twelve butchers shops, to be "fitted with a water tap and independent drain". The improvements were in place by 1851.

In 1867 a fire occurred in the hall; the cause was believed to be the spontaneous combustion of lucifer matches.

The hall was under the purview of the Birmingham Market Police, from their establishment under section 104 of the Birmingham Corporation (Consolidation) Act 1883.

Interior

Roof 

Lighting 

Gas lighting was used from the beginning, extending the business hours for the market. In later years the market hall was illuminated by electric arc lighting; a 1902 article notes that the blue colour of the light "gave to the fruit, flowers, and meat a peculiar hue which spoilt their fresh appearance, raised doubts, and caused people to hang back from investment." Many stallholders installed additional gas lighting to remediate the issue.

Fountain 

It was in the form of a Greek tazza and cost £900. On the inside of the bowl were eight lions' heads from which water was ejected. The fountain was inaugurated by the Chairman of the Market Committee, John Cadbury, on 24 December 1851. The fountain was removed in 1880 with the intention of re-erecting it in Highgate Park later that year but this did not happen and it was destroyed in 1923. The fountain was depicted, in situ, in an 1880 watercolour painting by Walter Langley, which is now in the collection of Birmingham Museum and Art Gallery.

Clock 

In 1936 a clock, formerly in the Imperial Arcade at Dale End, was restored - at the behest of Percy Shurmer - and installed. Crafted by William Potts and Sons of Leeds in 1883, and restored by them, it consisted of over-life-size figures of Guy of Warwick, the Countess, a retainer and a Saracen, and had bells (recast in 1935 by John Taylor & Co of Loughborough) that struck the hours and Westminster Quarters.

Destruction 

The interior (including the clock) and roof of the hall were destroyed on the night of 25 August 1940 after being set on fire by incendiary bombs, during an air raid of the Birmingham Blitz. Only the exterior walls remained. The site remained in use, with covered market stalls erected within the shell of the building. Small exhibitions also continued to be held here. The last remains were demolished in 1963. The site was then landscaped as an open space, Manzoni Gardens, being replaced in turn when the Bullring shopping mall was constructed in the early 21st century. The area is now part of the Ladywood constituency.

References 

Buildings and structures in Birmingham, West Midlands
Buildings and structures completed in 1835
Buildings and structures in the United Kingdom destroyed during World War II
Retail markets in England
Retailing in Birmingham, West Midlands
Ladywood
Buildings and structures demolished in 1963